Rational thermodynamics is a school of thought in statistical thermodynamics developed in the 1960s.
Its introduction is attributed to Clifford Truesdell (1919–2000), Bernard Coleman (b. 1929) and Walter Noll (1925–2017).
The aim was to develop a mathematical model of thermodynamics that would go beyond the traditional "thermodynamics of irreversible processes" or TIP developed in the late 19th to early 20th centuries.
Truesdell's "flamboyant style"  and "satirical verve" caused controversy between "rational thermodynamics" and proponents of traditional thermodynamics.

References

Clifford A. Truesdell, Rational Thermodynamics: A Course of Lectures on Selected Topics, Springer, (1969, 2nd ed. 1984).
Ingo Müller, Tommaso Ruggeri, Extended Rational Thermodynamics, Springer (1998),  doi:10.1007/978-1-4612-2210-1.

See also
Archive for Rational Mechanics and Analysis
Thermodynamics